Qohestan (also Romanized as Qohestān) is a city in, and the capital of, Qohestan District of Darmian County, South Khorasan province, Iran. At the 2006 census, its population was 2,451 in 674 households, when it was a village. The following census in 2011 counted 3,028 people in 741 households, by which time the village had been raised to the status of a city. The latest census in 2016 showed a population of 2,322 people in 701 households.

References 

Darmian County

Cities in South Khorasan Province

Populated places in South Khorasan Province

Populated places in Darmian County